Nicholas D. Smith (born 1949) is an American philosopher and James F. Miller Professor Emeritus of Humanities and Professor of Philosophy at Lewis & Clark College. He won the “Outstanding Academic Book for 1994” award for his book Plato’s Socrates (with T. C. Brickhouse). Smith is known for his research on Ancient Greek philosophy.

Books
 Socrates on Self-Improvement: Knowledge, Virtue, and Happiness (Cambridge University Press, forthcoming)
Summoning Knowledge in Plato's Republic (Oxford University Press 2019)
What the Ancients Offer to Contemporary Epistemology (ed. with S. Hetherington; Routledge 2019)
Knowledge in Ancient Philosophy (ed.; vol. 1 in The Philosophy of Knowledge: A History, S. Hetherington, gen. ed., 4 vols. Bloomsbury Press; 2018What.)
 The Bloomsbury Companion to Socrates (ed. with J. Bussanich; Bloomsbury Press 2013, 421 pp.)
 Knowledge (with I. Evans; Polity Press "Key Concepts" series; 2012, 238 pp.)
 Socratic Moral Psychology (with T. Brickhouse; Cambridge University Press, 2010, 276 pp.)
 Ancient Philosophy: Essential Readings with Commentary (Blackwell Readings in the History of Philosophy series, volume 1; edited; series editors F. Allhoff and A. Vaidya; Blackwell Publishing, 2008, 445 pp.)
 Socrates' Divine Sign: Religion, Practice, and Value in Socratic Philosophy (ed. with P. Destrée, Academic Printing and Publishing [Special Issue of Apeiron], 2005, 180 pp.)
 Routledge Philosophy GuideBook to Plato and the Trial of Socrates (with T. Brickhouse, Routledge 2004, 297 pp.)
 Philosophical Studies vol. 117/1-2, January 2004 (guest editor for Selected Proceedings from American Philosophical Association Pacific Division meetings, 2003; 325 pp.)
 The Trial and Execution of Socrates: Sources and Controversies (ed. and trans. with T. Brickhouse, Oxford University Press, 2002), 286 pp.
 Reason and Religion in Socratic Philosophy (ed. with P. Woodruff, Oxford University Press, 2000, 226 pp.)
 The Philosophy of Socrates (with T. Brickhouse, Westview Press, History of Philosophy series, 2000, 290 pp.)
 Plato: Critical Assessments in four volumes: vol. 1--Problems of Interpretation and Method; vol. 2--- Middle Period: Metaphysics and Epistemology; vol. 3-Plato's Middle Period: Psychology and Value Theory; vol. 4--Plato's Later Works (edited, Routledge, 1998)
 Knowledge, Teaching and Wisdom (edited with K. Lehrer, B. J. Lum, and B. Slichta, Kluwer Academic Publishers, Philosophical Studies series #67, 1996, 288 pp.)
 Plato's Socrates (with T. Brickhouse, Oxford University Press, 1994, 240 pp.)
 Methods of Interpreting Plato and His Dialogues (edited with J. Klagge, Oxford University Press--Oxford Studies in Ancient Philosophy, supplementary volume, 1992, 280 pp.)
 Utopian Studies III and IV (edited with M. Cummings and L. Leibacher-Ouvrard, University Press of America, 1991, 135 pp. and 96 pp. in one cover)--Selected Proceedings/Society for Utopian Studies.
 Socrates on Trial (with T. Brickhouse, Oxford University Press and Princeton University Press, 1989, 316 pp.; trans. into Japanese by T. Mishima and S. Yonezawa, Tokai University Press, 1994, 508 pp.)
 Utopian Studies II (edited with M. Cummings, University Press of America, 1988, 144 pp.)--Selected Proceedings/Society for Utopian Studies.
 Utopian Studies I (edited with G. Beauchamp and K. Roemer, University Press of America, 1987, 197 pp.)--Selected Proceedings/ Society for Utopian Studies.
 Women and Utopia: Critical Interpretations (edited with M. Barr, University Press of America, 1983, 171 pp.)--Selected Proceedings/ Society for Utopian Studies
 Philosophers Look at Science Fiction (edited, Chicago: NelsonHall, 1982, 204 pp.)
 Thought Probes (co-authored/edited with F. Miller, Jr.; Prentice-Hall, 1981, 354 pp.)--Introductory textbook in philosophy. 2nd edition, 1988, 334 pp. Rewritten by Ryan Nicholas and now published as Philosophy through Science Fiction: A Coursebook with Readings, Routledge, 2009.

References

External links
 Nicholas Smith's CV

American philosophers
Philosophy academics
Living people
Lewis & Clark College faculty
1949 births
Stanford University alumni
University of Rochester alumni